Pierre-Hugues Herbert and Nicolas Mahut were the defending champions but chose not to defend their title.

Łukasz Kubot and Mate Pavić were in contention for the ATP no. 1 doubles ranking at the beginning of the tournament. Pavić attained the top ranking after both he and Kubot (along with their respective partners) lost in the quarterfinals. Pavić will be the first player from Croatia (male or female) to achieve a no. 1 ranking and the youngest ATP doubles no. 1 player since 1996.

Juan Sebastián Cabal and Robert Farah won their first Masters 1000 title, defeating Pablo Carreño Busta and João Sousa in the final, 3–6, 6–4, [10–4].

Seeds
All seeds receive a bye into the second round.

Draw

Finals

Top half

Bottom half

References

External links
 Main Draw

Men's Doubles